Rupsa is a town of Balasore district in Odisha.

History
The Mayurbhanj State Railway was started by the erstwhile ruler of Mayurbhanj State Maharja Shri Sriram Chandra Bhanj Deo. The first section of 52 km from Rupsa Junction to Baripada was opened for traffic on 20 January 1905. Rupsa was the junction with the Bengal Nagpur Railway’s  line. An agreement was signed on 2 December 1918, between the Mayurbhanj State and Mayurbhanj Railway Company, for extending the line to Talband, 61.5 km away. This section was opened on 15 July 1920. From that date, the management of the entire Rupsa-Talband section was handed over to Mayurbhanj Railway Company, formed in 1920 to take over this line.

Educational institutions
Nilamani Mahavidyalaya, Rupsa
Govt. High School, Hirapur, Rupsa
Harihar M. E. School, Rupsa
Mohapatra High School, Rupsa, Kasipada Panchayat high school Rupsa
Jogendra Higher Secondary School
Udaya Nath Mohapatra Uchha Vidya Niketan, Barapal
Bakharabad upme school -bakharabad ref></ref>

Festivals celebrated 
Apart from the normal festival celebrated there are some festivals celebrated with much attention. These are:
 Rupsa Mohastav
 Vijayadasami

Highways and railway station 
 NH 16 Highway Connect Rupsa to Balasore and Kolkata
 Rupsa Junction Connects South Eastern Railway To Mayurbhanj District

Healthcare institutions 
 Rupsa Govt Hospital

Industry presence 
 Rupsa Jute Mill (located near Rupsa Junction)

References

External links 
Rupsa Weather

Cities and towns in Balasore district